Lil Boat may refer to:

 Lil Yachty, American artist and rapper also known as Lil Boat
Lil Boat (mixtape), the debut commercial mixtape by Lil Yachty, 2016
Lil Boat 2, second studio album by Lil Yachty, 2018
Lil Boat 3, the fourth studio album by Lil Yachty, 2020

See also
"Lil Red Boat", a 1998 song by Angel Grant